Model Media (Simplified Chinese: 麻豆传媒；Traditional Chinese: 麻豆傳媒；Pinyin: Mádòu Chuánméi) is a US registered pornographic website producing films in Chinese. It recruits porn actors and actresses in mainland China and Taiwan. The content of its films is mainly inspired by the storylines of Japanese adult videos (JAVs) or well-known East Asian movies. Although actors and actresses are mostly Taiwanese, the film makers require them to speak in mainland Chinese accents and diction, and the covers, subtitles and advertisements are all in simplified Chinese.

At the end of 2020, its app was on the list of those announced by the Cyberspace Administration of China to be cleaned up and taken down. In January 2022, police of Shanghai city rushed to Guangdong and Sichuan provinces to arrest 24 members of Model Media.

References 

Chinese erotica and pornography websites
Internet properties established in 2019